Tyler Haskins (born May 26, 1986) is an American former professional ice hockey forward. He was selected by the Detroit Red Wings in the 5th round (162nd overall) of the 2004 NHL Entry Draft.

Playing career
Haskins spent his early career in the USHL with the Sioux City Musketeers and in the OHL with the Guelph Storm and the Toronto St. Michael's Majors. Between 2007 and 2010, he saw action in 164 AHL games for the Bridgeport Sound Tigers, interrupted by a stint with ECHL side Utah Grizzlies. He had signed with the New York Islanders in May 2008, who were affiliated with the Sound Tigers.

He signed with the Grizzlies Wolfsburg of the German top flight Deutsche Eishockey Liga (DEL) for the 2010–11 season. Beginning in 2013, he served as team captain. Despite offers from other clubs over the years, Haskins opted to remain with the Grizzlies and on February 24, 2016, he put pen to paper on a new deal that would keep him in Wolfsburg until 2020.

On March 26, 2018, he announced his immediate retirement from his professional playing career due to multiple concussions which he had suffered throughout his playing days. He accepted a position to remain within the Grizzlys Wolfsburg organization as a scout.

Career statistics

References

External links

1986 births
American men's ice hockey centers
Bridgeport Sound Tigers players
Detroit Red Wings draft picks
Guelph Storm players
Living people
People from Madison, Ohio
Saginaw Spirit players
Toronto St. Michael's Majors players
Utah Grizzlies (ECHL) players
Grizzlys Wolfsburg players